John Walter Gregory,  (27 January 1864 – 2 June 1932) was a British geologist and explorer, known principally for his work on glacial geology and on the geography and geology of Australia and East Africa.

The Gregory Rift in the Great Rift Valley is named in his honour.

Early life
Gregory was born in Bow, London, the only son of a John James Gregory, a wool merchant, and his wife Jane, née Lewis. Gregory was educated at Stepney Grammar School and at 15 became a clerk at wool sales in London. He later took evening classes at the Birkbeck Literary and Scientific Institution (now Birkbeck, University of London). He matriculated in 1886, graduated BSc with first-class honours in 1891 and D. Sc. (London) in 1893. In 1887 he was appointed an assistant in the geological department of the Natural History Museum, London.

Career
Gregory remained at the museum until 1900 and was responsible for a Catalogue of the Fossil Bryozoa in three volumes (1896, 1899 and 1909), and a monograph on the Jurassic Corals of Cutch (1900). He obtained leave at various times to travel in Europe, the West Indies, North America, and East Africa. The Great Rift Valley (1896), is an interesting account of a journey to Mount Kenya and Lake Baringo made in 1892–3. Gregory was the first to mount a specifically scientific expedition to the mountain. He made some key observations about the geology which still stand. He made the first known attempt to climb the mountain, penetrating the montane forest zone and climbing past the Afro-alpine moorland to the glaciers, rocks and snow. The Gregory Glacier, of which little now remains, on the North side of the mountain, was named after him. Although he never saw this glacier he named the Lewis, Darwin, Heim, Forel and Tyndal Glaciers after eminent Victorian scientists. In 1896 he did excellent work as naturalist to Sir Martin Conway's expedition across Spitsbergen. His well-known memoir on glacial geology written in collaboration with Edmund J. Garwood belongs to this period.

Gregory's polar and glaciological work led to his brief selection and service in 1900-1 as director of the civilian scientific staff of the Discovery Expedition. The expedition was in planning during this period, and had not yet set sail for Antarctica when Gregory was compelled to resign from his position upon learning that he was outranked by the expedition's commander, Robert Falcon Scott.

Australia
The University of Melbourne had created new chair in geology and mineralogy created after the death of Frederick McCoy; on 11 December 1899 Gregory was appointed professor of geology and began his duties in the following February. Gregory was less than five years in Australia but his influence lasted for many years after he left. He succeeded in doing a large amount of work, his teaching was most successful, and he was personally popular. But he came to the university when it was in great financial trouble, there was no laboratory worthy of the name, and the council could not promise any immediate improvement. In 1904 he accepted the chair of geology at Glasgow, and he was back in Great Britain in October of that year. Besides carrying out his professional work he had many other activities during his stay in Australia; during the summer of 1901–2 he had spent his vacation in Central Australia and made a journey around Lake Eyre. An account of this, The Dead Heart of Australia, was published in 1906, dedicated to the geologists of Australia. He also published a popular book on The Foundation of British East Africa (1901), The Austral Geography (1902 and 1903), for school use, and The Geography of Victoria (1903). Another volume, The Climate of Australasia (1904), was expanded from his presidential address to the geographical section of the Australasian Association for the Advancement of Science which met at Dunedin in January 1904. The Mount Lyell Mining Field, Tasmania, was published in 1905. This does not give a complete impression of Gregory's activities in Australia, for he was director of the Geological Survey of Victoria from 1901, in which year he was elected a fellow of the Royal Society, London, and he was able also to find time for university extension lecturing.

Glasgow
In 1904 Gregory was awarded the chair in Geology at Glasgow University winning against Thomas James Jehu, Philip Lake and others. He occupied his chair at Glasgow for 25 years and obtained a great reputation both as a teacher and as an administrator. In 1905 he was elected a Fellow of the Royal Society of Edinburgh. His proposers were Sir John Graham Kerr, John Horne, Ben Peach, and Lionel Wordsworth. He served as the Society's vice president from 1920 to 1923 and won their Keith Prize for 1921–23. His students included John Vernon Harrison who was greatly impacted by Gregory.

After his retirement in 1929, he was succeeded by Sir Edward Battersby Bailey (Glasgow chair in geology 1929–1937). He made several expeditions including one to Cyrenaica in North Africa in 1908, where he showed the same interest in archaeology as in his own subjects; another was to southern Angola in 1912. His journey to Tibet with his son is recorded in To the Alps of Chinese Tibet by J. W. and C. J. Gregory (1923). His other books on geology and geography include:
Geography: Structural Physical and Compartitive (1908)
Geology (Scientific Primers Series) (1910)

The Nature and Origin of Fiords (1913)
Geology of To-Day (1915)
, in the Cambridge manuals of science and literature
The Rift Valleys and Geology of East Africa (1921), a continuation of the studies contained in his volume published in 1896
The Elements of Economic Geology (1927)
General Stratigraphy (in collaboration with B. H. Barrett) (1931)
Dalradian Geology (1931)
 
He wrote books in other subjects as well, such as The Story of the Road (1931), and he dabbled in eugenics with The Menace of Colour (1925) and Human Migration and the Future (1928).

Death

In January 1932 Gregory went on an expedition to South America to explore and study the volcanic and earthquake centres of the Andes. The expedition, sponsored by the Royal Geographical Society in London, made the first geological traverse of the central Andes of Peru. His boat overturned and he was drowned in the Urubamba River in southern Peru on 2 June 1932. One of his companions on this expedition was the diplomat, artist and author Victor Coverley-Price who painted extensively whilst on the expedition. He was in Gregory's canoe and narrowly escaped death when it overturned and later wrote about the expedition in his own autobiography and for the Royal Geographical Society.

Legacy
He was president of the Geological Society of London from 1928 to 1930, and was awarded many scientific honours including the Bigsby Medal in 1905. Apart from his books he also wrote about 300 papers on geological geographical, and sociological subjects. 
Gregory was a modest man, sincere, with wide interests. A fast thinker who did an extraordinary amount of work, it is possible that as a geologist he sometimes generalised from insufficient data; his last work Dalradian Geology was adversely reviewed in the Geological Magazine. Nevertheless, he was one of the most prominent geologists of his period, widely recognised outside his own country. Most of his books could be read with interest by both people of science and the general public, and as scientist, teacher, traveller, and man of letters, he had much influence on the knowledge of his time.

Honours
The Gregory Rift in the Great Rift Valley and are named in his honour. He visited central Kenya in 1893 and again in 1919 and his 1896 book The Great Rift Valley is considered a classic. He was the first to use the term "rift valley", which he defined as "a linear valley with parallel and almost vertical sides, which has fallen owing to a series of parallel faults".
The mineral gregoryite, first found in the Great Rift Valley, is named after him.

Racial views
Like many other intellectuals and writers during the 1920s, Gregory held Scientific Racist views based on Galtonism and the belief that opposition to cross-breeding in animals could be applied to miscegenation. In 1931, with Sir Arthur Keith, he delivered the annual Conway Hall lecture entitled Race as a Political Factor. The lecture contained as its abstract:
The three primary racial groups within the human species are the Caucasian, mongoloid and negroid. From analogy with cross-breeding in animals and plants, and from experience of human cross-breeding, it can be asserted that inter-marriage between members of the three groups produces inferior progeny. Hence racial segregation is to be recommended. However, the different races can still assist, and co-operate with, each other, in the interests of peace and harmony.

Family

Gregory married Audrey Chaplin, daughter of the Rev. Ayrton Chaplin, and had a son and a daughter.

Selected works
The living races of mankind: a popular illustrated account of the customs, habits, pursuits, feasts and ceremonies of the races of mankind throughout the world By Henry Neville Hutchinson, John Walter Gregory, Richard Lydekker (1902) D. Appleton.
The Living Races of Mankind By Richard Lydekker, Henry Neville Hutchinson, John Walter Gregory (1985) Mittal Publications Volume 2

Gregory, J.W. 1911. The terms "Denudation," "Erosion," "Corrosion," and "Corrasion". The Geographical Journal 37(2):189–195.
Gregory, J.W. 1914. The lake system of Westralia. The Geographical Journal 43(6):656–664.
Gregory, J.W., Evans, J.W., Lamplugh, Mr. and Freshfield, D. 1917. Erosion and resulting land forms in sub-arid Western Australia, including the origin and growth of dry lakes: discussion. The Geographical Journal 50(6):434–437.

Biography
Leake, B. E. 2011. The Life and Work of Professor J. W. Gregory FRS (1864– 1932): Geologist, Writer and Explorer. Geological Society,
London, Memoirs, 34.,  and

References

J. F. Lovering, 'Gregory, John Walter (1864–1932)', Australian Dictionary of Biography, Volume 9, MUP, 1983, pp 100–101. Retrieved on 27 December 2008

Archives
The archives for John Walter Gregory are maintained by the  Archives of the University of Glasgow (GUAS).

External links

1864 births
1932 deaths
English geologists
English geographers
British eugenicists
People from Bow, London
Deaths by drowning
Alumni of Birkbeck, University of London
Fellows of the Royal Society
Accidental deaths in Peru
Victoria Medal recipients